The Mākara River is a tributary of the Huangarua River, part of the Ruamahanga River system in the North Island of New Zealand. It flows north from the Aorangi Range, reaching the Huangarua to the south of Martinborough.

References

Rivers of the Wellington Region
Rivers of New Zealand